Iris Calderhead (January 3, 1889 – March 6, 1966) was an American suffragist and organizer in the National Woman's Party. She earned an A.B. in English from the University of Kansas in 1910 and completed a graduate degree at Bryn Mawr College in 1913. She was the daughter of William A. Calderhead, the congressional representative for Kansas' 5th District from 1895 to 1911.

Education and academic work 
Calderhead attended the University of Kansas from 1906 to 1910, graduating with an A.B. in English. During her time at the university, she was a member of Pi Beta Phi, a fraternity dedicated to the educational advancement of women. In 1910, she published an article in the journal Modern Language Notes and began graduate studies at Bryn Mawr, having won a fellowship there. 

From 1910 to 1911, she was a Graduate Scholar in English, and from 1912 to 1913 was a resident fellow in English. She spent the summer of 1913 at the University of Chicago and returned to Marysville to teach English and science. In 1916, her work on Middle English appeared in Modern Philology, publishing for the first time several fragments of early morality plays.

Activism 
Calderhead became involved in the women's suffrage movement after meeting Doris Stevens and Lucy Burns, leaders of the Congressional Union, in New York City.  Her first assignment in 1915 was to help organize the Union's exhibit at the Panama–Pacific International Exposition and the Women's Voter Convention. Calderhead was willing to travel extensively to advocate for suffrage.  "I came a long way to work for the union because national suffrage seems to me the biggest political issue before the country," she explained.  "I think I ought to be able to convince others of this."

In 1916 Calderhead, in her role as secretary of the Congressional Union of Kansas, sent a letter to the House Committee on the Judiciary, informing them that on March 15, the fourth Kansas district Republican Convention had adopted a resolution favoring women's suffrage. In August that same year, the NWP dispatched teams to states that had already granted suffrage to mobilize support for a federal amendment for women's suffrage. Calderhead was sent to Arizona, which had granted women the right to vote in 1912, along with Vivian Pierce, Ella Thompson, Helen Todd, and Rose Winslow.  The group met resistance from the Democratic Party, which opposed women's suffrage, and Calderhead reported that members of the party tried to ban the suffragists' meetings. She also traveled to Oklahoma to recruit supporters, telling a reporter for the Tulsa World that "We women of the [enfranchised] West must try to put ourselves in the places of the women of the great industrial centers of the East. These are the women for whom we are making this fight for freedom. It is literally that – a fight for liberation."

In June 1917, Calderhead was arrested at the Smithsonian Institution, where she and fellow organizer Elizabeth Stuyvesant planned to display a banner during a visit by President Woodrow Wilson. On July 14, 1917, Calderhead was arrested again for picketing the White House during the Silent Sentinels demonstrations and served three days in the Occoquan Workhouse.

From January to June 1918, Calderhead conducted a speaking tour through Colorado, Massachusetts, Ohio, and Pennsylvania.

The Nineteenth Amendment to the United States Constitution guaranteed women's right to vote in the United States in 1919, but Calderhead's activism did not stop then. In 1932 she spoke before the House Foreign Affairs committee on the rights of women in the League of Nations.

Private life 
Iris Calderhead was born January 3, 1889, in Marysville, Kansas, to Alice Gallant Calderhead and William Calderhead.

Calderhead married John Brisben Walker (d. 1931) in 1918 and moved to Mt. Morrison, Colorado. In 1919, Walker and Calderhead founded a paper to promote "outspoken and fearless discussions of the great questions of the day." During the Great Depression she was an official at the Consumers' Counsel Division of the Agricultural Adjustment Administration and authored the 1936 report "Consumer Services of Government Agencies".

In 1941, she married Wallace Pratt, and the two moved to Pratt's home in McKittrick Canyon in far West Texas. They moved to Arizona in 1960, so that Calderhead could receive treatment for arthritis. Calderhead died March 6, 1966, in Tucson, Arizona.

See also
List of suffragists and suffragettes

References

1889 births
1966 deaths
American suffragists
Bryn Mawr College alumni
University of Kansas alumni
People from Marysville, Kansas
Activists from Kansas